The Fokker T.IV was a Dutch torpedo bomber/maritime reconnaissance floatplane of the 1920s and 1930s.  First flying in 1927, it served with the Dutch Naval Aviation Service in the Dutch East Indies until the remaining aircraft were destroyed during the Japanese invasion in 1942.

Development and design
The Fokker T.IV was developed to meet the requirements of the Royal Netherlands Navy for a maritime patrol/torpedo bomber aircraft for use in the Dutch East Indies. First flying on June 7, 1927, the T.IV was a twin engined floatplane with a thick, cantilever, high mounted monoplane wing and a deep, slab-sided fuselage with an open cockpit housing the two-man crew. The aircraft could carry either a torpedo or 800 kg (1,764 lb) of bombs, and had a defensive armament of three machine guns in nose, dorsal and ventral positions,  The initial version was powered by two  Lorraine-Dietrich 12E W-12 engines.

In 1935, Fokker produced a developed version, the T-IVa, to supplement the existing T-IVs in Dutch service. Wright Cyclone radial engines replaced the Lorraine Dietriches, while the pilots were provided with an enclosed cockpit in a hump over the wing root, and enclosed nose and dorsal gun turrets were fitted. 12 were built for the Dutch Naval Aviation Service, while the remaining T-IVs were rebuilt to the T-IVa standard.

Operational history
Deliveries of the original T.IV to the Dutch Naval Aviation Service in the Dutch East Indies started in 1927 and continued until 1930. The second batch of 12 TIVa aircraft was delivered to the East Indies from 1936 to 1938, and the original T.IVs were rebuilt as T.IVas.

The T.IV proved to be a reliable and seaworthy aircraft, and continued in use for local patrols and air-sea rescue operations from the naval base at Soerabaja on Java until 1942, when the Japanese attacked the Dutch East Indies. All the remaining TIVs were destroyed during the Japanese invasion, either by Japanese bombing or scuttling.

Variants
T.IV
Original production version, powered by 336 kW (450 hp) Lorraine-Dietrich 12E engines. 18 built. 
T.IVa
Refined version with Wright SR-1820-F2 Cyclone radial engines, enclosed cockpit and gun turrets. 12 built.

Operators

Dutch Naval Aviation Service

Portuguese Naval Aviation - Portugal received three T.IVs, powered by Rolls-Royce Eagle engines.

Specifications (T.IVa)

See also

References

Notes

Bibliography

 "THE FOKKER T. IV SEAPLANE: A Twin-Engined Torpedo or Bombing Monoplane". Flight. 26 January 1928. Pages 49–50.
 Donald, David (ed.) The Encyclopedia of World Aircraft. Aerospace Publishing. 1997. .
 Gunston, Bill. The Encyclopedia of the World's Combat Aircraft. Feltham, Middlesex, UK,: Hamlyn, 1977. .
 Taylor, M.J.H. Warplanes of the World: 1918–1939. Shepperton, Surrey, UK: Ian Allan, 1981. .
 Taylor M.J.H.(Editor). Jane's Encyclopedia of Aviation. London: Bracken, 1989. .
 Purnell's Illustrated Encyclopedia of Modern Weapons and Warfare (Part work 1978–1979). London : Phoebus. p. 2336.

External links

http://www.airwar.ru/enc/bww1/fokt4.html
http://www.dutch-aviation.nl/index5/Military/index5-1%20T4.html

T 04
1920s Dutch military reconnaissance aircraft
High-wing aircraft
Aircraft first flown in 1927
Twin piston-engined tractor aircraft